Channelling Baby is a 1999 New Zealand film starring several of the country's well known actors as well as up and coming actress Amber Sainsbury.

Plot
After being blinded by taking drugs in the 1970s during an eclipse, Bunnie (Danielle Cormack) marries her Vietnam soldier boyfriend, Geoff (Kevin Smith). However, as she remains very flaky, he eventually disappears and takes their child with him. Twenty years later, Bunnie decides to use a medium, Cassandra (Amber Sainsbury), to try to find her daughter.

Cast
Danielle Cormack as Bunnie
Kevin Smith as Geoff
Amber Sainsbury as Cassandra
Jodie Rimmer as Baby (voice)
Donogh Rees as Childbirth Nurse #1
William Sabin as David Curtis
Joel Tobeck as Tony
Alison Wall as Childbirth Nurse #2
Bunny Walters as himself
Joshua Bricknell as Baby #1

Awards

External links
 Official Website

1999 films
1999 drama films
New Zealand drama films
1990s English-language films